Procyanidin A1 is an A type proanthocyanidin dimer.

It is an epicatechin-(2β→7,4β→8)-catechin dimer found in Rhododendron spiciferum, in peanut skins and in Ecdysanthera utilis.

Procyanidin B1 can be converted into procyanidin A1 by radical oxidation using 1,1-diphenyl-2-picrylhydrazyl (DPPH) radicals under neutral conditions.

References 

Procyanidin dimers